238 (two hundred [and] thirty-eight) is the natural number following 237 and preceding 239.

In mathematics 

238 is an untouchable number.
There are 238 2-vertex-connected graphs on five labeled vertices, and 238 order-5 polydiamonds (polyiamonds that can partitioned into 5 diamonds). Out of the 720 permutations of six elements, exactly 238 of them have a unique longest increasing subsequence.

There are 238 compact and paracompact hyperbolic groups of ranks 3 through 10.

References

Integers